England have competed seven times in the World Cup; in 1975, 1995, 2000, 2008, 2013, 2017 and 2021. They have never won the competition, though finished runners-up three times to Australia; in 1975, 1995 and 2017. In every other year, Great Britain have represented England.

Results

Tournaments

Players records

Most appearances at World Cups

Most tries at World Cups

See also

References

External links

England national rugby league team
Rugby League World Cup